Yushi Li (born 1991) is a Chinese-born, London-based photographer whose work is concerned with the male gaze and the female gaze.

Life and work
Li was born in Hunan province, China and now lives in London. She earned an MA in photography at the Royal College of Art in London and was, as of 2019, studying for a PhD in Arts and Humanities there.
 
Her photography, through series such as Your Reservation is Confirmed, My Tinder Boys, and Paintings, Dreams and Love, is concerned with the male gaze and the female gaze. "Her work has typically featured naked, white and Western men, shown as acquiescent or vulnerable, while she is clothed and assertive, meeting the viewer’s gaze."

Publications with contributions by Li
209 Women. Liverpool: Bluecoat, 2019. .

Exhibitions

Solo exhibitions
Your Reservation is Confirmed, Fotogalleri Vasli Souza, Malmo, Sweden, 2019
Women Act, Men Appear, Union Gallery, London, 2020/21

Group exhibitions
209 Women, Portcullis House, Parliament of the United Kingdom, London, 2018/2019; Open Eye Gallery, Liverpool, 2019

See also
Alix Marie
Gender equality

References

External links

"Photographers in Focus: Yushi Li" – Li explains her work (video)
 

 
21st-century women photographers
Chinese photographers
Chinese women photographers
Alumni of the Royal College of Art
Alumni of University College London
Artists from Hunan
Living people
1991 births
Nude photography